A precipitin is an antibody which can precipitate out of a solution upon antigen binding.

Precipitin reaction
The precipitin reaction provided the first quantitative assay for antibody. The precipitin reaction is based upon the interaction of antigen with antibody leading to the production of antigen-antibody complexes.

To produce a precipitin reaction, varying amounts of soluble antigen are added to a fixed amount of serum containing antibody. As the amount of antigen added:
 In the zone of antibody excess, each molecule of antigen is bound extensively by antibody and crosslinked to other molecules of antigen.  The average size of antibody-antigen complex is small; cross-linking between antigen molecules by antibody is rare.
 In the zone of equivalence, the formation of precipitin complexes is optimal. Extensive lattices of antigen and antibody are formed by cross-linking.
 At high concentrations of antigen, the average size of antibody-antigen complexes is once again small because few antibody molecules are available to cross-link antigen molecules together.

The small, soluble immune complexes formed in vivo in the zone of antigen excess can cause a variety of pathological syndromes.

Antibody can only precipitate antigenic substrates that are multivalent—that is, only antigens that have multiple antibody-binding sites epitopes. This allows for the formation of large antigen:antibody complexes.

External links
 
 

Biochemistry detection reactions
Immune system